Drome is a locality in the Great Southern Region of Western Australia. The site is in the traditional settlement area of the Mineng Aboriginal tribe.

Geography
Drome is bounded by Marbelup in the west and south, Willyung in the east, and Redmond and Green Valley in the north.

Demographics
The median age of persons in Drome was 36 years. There were less males than females, with 46% of the population male and 54% female. The average household size was 2.9 people per household.

References

City of Albany, Western Australia
Towns in Western Australia